The South Essex League was a football league that was held in Essex and East London.

History
The league was formed for the 1892–93 season. Only four clubs in the league managed to fulfill all their fixtures, with Barking Excelsior winning the league and Grays Town finishing runners-up. The league was restarted in the 1895–96 season. Upon the reformation of the league in the 1895–96 season, Leyton were champions, with St Luke's placing second.

The league disbanded at the end of the 1988–89 season.

1895–96 season table
<onlyinclude>

Champions

South Essex League First Division
1892–93 – Barking Excelsior
1895–96 – Leyton
1897–98 – Leytonstone
1898–99 – Barking Woodville
1899–1900 – Leyton
1900–01 – West Ham United reserves
1901–02 – Leytonstone
1902–03 – Leytonstone (1A); Grays Town (1B)
1903–04 – Woodford (1A); Southend Athletic (1B)
1904–05 – Southend Athletic
1905–06 – South Weald
1906–07 – South Weald
1907–08 – 4th Kings Royal Rifles (1A); Shoeburyness Garrison (1B)
1908–09 – 4th Kings Royal Rifles
1909–10 – South Weald
1910–11 – Custom House
1911–12 – Barking
1912–13 – Colchester Town
1913–14 – Shoeburyness Garrison
1914–15 – Grays Athletic
1921–22 – Tilbury
1946–47 – Brentwood & Warley
1949–50 – Storey Athletic
1955–56 – Witham Town

South Essex League Second Division
1896–97 – Woodford reserves
1897–98 – Woodgrange Wesley
1898–99 – Leyton reserves
1899–1900 – Leyton reserves
1900–01 – Barking Institute
1901–02 – Barking Institute (2A); Leigh Town (2B)
1902–03 – Romford (2A); Southend Athletic (2B)
1903–04 – Leigh Ramblers (Eastern); Newportonians (Western)
1904–05 – Southend Victoria (Eastern); Barking Victoria (Western)
1905–06 – Leigh Ramblers (Eastern); Barking Victoria (Western)
1906–07 – Southend Corinthian (Eastern); South West Ham (Western)
1907–08 – Custom House reserves
1908–09 – Clapton 'A' (2A); Grays Athletic
1909–10 – Woodford Crusaders (2A); Beckton (2B)
1910–11 – Custom House reserves
1911–12 – Silvertown Rubber Works
1913–14 – Grays Athletic 'A'
1914–15 – Grays Athletic 'A'
1922–23 – Tilbury
1924–25 – Tilbury
1946–47 – Storey Athletic
1947–48 – Storey Athletic

Member clubs

1st Norfolk Regiment
4th Kings Royal Rifles
Ascension
Barking
Barking Borough
Barking Excelsior
Barking Institute
Barking Victoria
Barking Woodville
Barking Working Men’s Institute
Barkingside
Basildon Town
Bata Sports
Beckton
Becontree United
Boleyn Castle
Border Rangers
Borough United
Brentwood
Brentwood & Warley
Brentwood St. Thomas
Brittons
Buckhurst Hill
Burnham Ramblers
Canning Town
Caterham
Chadwell Manor
Chelmsford
Chelmsford Swifts
Chingford Casuals
Commercial Athletic
Clapton 'A'
Claptonians
Crittall Athletic
Crittall Athletic (Witham)
Custom House
Dagenham Cables
Dagenham Trades
Dagenham WMC
Downshall Athletic
Debden Sports
Downshall Athletic reserves
Colchester Town
East Ham Town
East Ham United
Esso
Fairbairn House
Fenchurch
Fletchers
Forest Swifts
Gnome Athletic
Grange Park
Grays Athletic
Grays Town
Grays United
Great Eastern Railway Rovers
Green and Silley Weir
Hainault
Heathwell United
Heybridge Swifts
H. M. Customs
Hoffman Athletic
Hope
Ilford
Ilford Alliance
Ilford Electricity
Jurgens
Kelvedon Hatch
Kingswood
Leigh Ramblers
Leigh Town
Leyton
Leyton Amateurs
Leyton United
Leytonstone
Leytonstone United
Limehouse Town
London Electric
Manor Park
Manor Park Albion
Mansfield House
Mayfield
Newmont
Newportonians 
Peoples' Palace
Pitfield
P.L.A
Product Works
Rainham reserves
Romford
Romford Ivy Leafers
Romford St. Andrew’s
Romford Town
Romford United
Sandringham Central
Shoeburyness Garrison
Silvertown Rubber Works
Sheppey United
SM Tipples
Snaresbrook
Southend Amateurs
Southend Athletic
Southend Corinthian
Southend United reserves
Southend Victoria
South Weald
South West Ham
Springfield
St Luke's
Staines United
Storey Athletic
Stork
Stratford Y.M.C.A
Temperance United
Temple Mills
Thames Ironworks
Thames Mills
Tilbury
Trowbridge
Upminster reserves
Upton United
Walthamstow Grange
Walthamstow Holborn
Wanstead
Wanstead Amateurs
West Ham Amateurs
West Ham Garfield
West Ham United reserves
West Thurrock Athletic
Witham Town
Woodford
Woodford Crusaders
Woodford Swifts
Woodgrange Wesley

References

 
Football competitions in London
Defunct football leagues in England
Football in Essex
Sports leagues established in 1892
1892 establishments in England
Sports leagues disestablished in 1989
1989 disestablishments in England